The Berlin Cathedral, also known as the Evangelical Supreme Parish and Collegiate Church, is a monumental German Evangelical  church and dynastic tomb (House of Hohenzollern) on the Museum Island in central Berlin. Having its origins as a castle chapel for the Berlin Palace, several structures have served to house the church since the 15th century. The present collegiate church was built from 1894 to 1905 by order of German Emperor William II according to plans by Julius Raschdorff in Renaissance and Baroque Revival styles. The listed building is the largest Protestant church in Germany and one of the most important dynastic tombs in Europe. In addition to church services, the cathedral is used for state ceremonies, concerts and other events.

Since the demolition of the Memorial Church (Denkmalskirche) section on the north side by the East German authorities in 1975, the Berlin Cathedral has consisted of the large Sermon Church (Predigtkirche) in the center, and the smaller Baptismal and Matrimonial Church (Tauf- und Traukirche) on the south side and the Hohenzollern crypt (Hohenzollerngruft), which covers almost the entire basement. Damaged during the Allied bombing in World War II, the cathedral's original interior was restored by 2002. Currently there is discussion about restoring the historical exterior as well.

Term
Berlin Cathedral is the common name for the Supreme Parish and Collegiate Church in Berlin, Germany.

The Dom is the parish church of the congregation Gemeinde der Oberpfarr- und Domkirche zu Berlin, a member of the umbrella organisation Evangelical Church of Berlin-Brandenburg-Silesian Upper Lusatia. The term Dom denotes a collegiate church (equivalent to the Italian duomo, or the English "Minster"); however, as most cathedrals are also collegiate churches, the term "Dom" has become the common term for a cathedral in German, though they are not synonymous. Berlin Cathedral has never been a cathedral in the actual sense of that term since it has never been the seat of a bishop. The bishop of the Evangelical Church in Berlin-Brandenburg (under this name 1945–2003) is based at St. Mary's Church and Kaiser Wilhelm Memorial Church in Berlin.

History
Berlin Cathedral has a long history starting as a Roman Catholic place of worship in the 15th century.

Establishment of a Collegiate Church in Berlin (1451–1536)
The history of today's Supreme Parish and Collegiate Church and its community dates back to 1451. In that year Prince-Elector Frederick II Irontooth of Brandenburg moved with his residence from Brandenburg upon Havel to Cölln (today's Fishers' Island, the southern part of Museums Island) into the newly erected City Palace, which also housed a Catholic chapel. In 1454 Frederick Irontooth, after having returned – via Rome – from his pilgrimage to Jerusalem, elevated the chapel to become a parish church, richly endowing it with relics and altars. Pope Nicholas V ordered Stephan Bodecker, then Prince-Bishop of Brandenburg, to consecrate the chapel to Erasmus of Formiae.

A collegiate church is a church endowed with revenues and earning estates, in order to provide a number of canons, called in canon law a College, with prebends. In this respect a collegiate church is similar to a cathedral, which is why in colloquial German the term cathedral college (Domstift), became the synecdoche used – pars pro toto – for all canon-law colleges. So the college of St. Erasmus' chapel, called Domstift in German, bestowed the pertaining church its colloquial naming, Domkirche (cathedral church). Frederick Irontooth provided the college with estates, sufficient to supply eight canon prebendaries. On 20 January 1469, Dietrich IV, then Prince-Bishop of Brandenburg, invested eight clergymen, chosen by Frederick Irontooth, as collegiate canons with the prebends.

The Collegiate Church in the former Black Friars' Church of St. Paul's south of the Palace (1536–1747)

In 1535, Prince-Elector Joachim II Hector reached the consent of Pope Paul III to shut down the 1297-founded Dominican convent (Black Friars), southerly neighboured to the palace, to acquire the pertaining monastic St. Paul's Church, built ca. in 1345. On 28 May 1536, most of the Black Friars moved to a Dominican monastery in Brandenburg upon Havel. Joachim II Hector assigned the thus void, three-nave church building to the Collegiate Church of Our Lady, the Holy Cross, the Ss. Peter, Paul, Erasmus and Nicholas and enlarged the College to 12 prebendaries, bestowing two of them to canons taken on from the Dominican convent. 
 
In 1538, a new western façade with two towers was attached to the collegiate church, which – due to its prior status as a church of a mendicant order – had no tower before. In the next year, Joachim II Hector converted from Catholicism to Lutheranism, as many of his subjects had done earlier. The collegiate church thus became Lutheran too, like most of the electoral subjects and all the churches in the Electorate. However, Joachim II Hector's ideas of Reformation were different from the modern ones. After his conversion he enriched the collegiate church with luxuriant furnishings, such as paraments, monstrances, relics, chasubles, carpets and antependia. From 1545 on the electoral family of Hohenzollern used the church building as their burial place.

 In 1608, the year of his accession to the throne, Prince-Elector John Sigismund, then a crypto-Calvinist, dissolved the college and the church was renamed into Supreme Parish Church of Holy Trinity in Cölln. In 1613, John Sigismund publicly confessed his Calvinist faith (in Germany usually called Reformed Church), but waived his privilege to demand the same of his subjects (Cuius regio, eius religio). So he and his family, except his steadfastly Lutheran wife Anna, converted, while most of his subjects remained Lutherans. While Berlin's other churches, subject to Lutheran city-council jurisdiction, remained Lutheran, the Supreme Parish Church of Holy Trinity, the Hohenzollern's house church, became Berlin's first, and until 1695, only Calvinist church, serving from 1632 on as the parish for all Calvinists in town. Being now a Calvinist church, the patronage of the Holy Trinity was increasingly skipped.

In 1667, the dilapidated double-tower façade was torn down and in 1717 Martin Böhme erected a new baroque façade with two towers. With the effect of 1 January 1710, Cölln was united with Berlin under the latter name. In 1747, the Supreme Parish Church was completely demolished to clear space for the baroque extension of Berlin Palace.

The Supreme Parish Church in its new Building north of the Palace (1750–1893)
 

On 6 September 1750, the new baroque Calvinist Supreme Parish Church was inaugurated, built by Johann Boumann the Elder in 1747–1750. The electoral tombs were transferred to the new building. The new structure covered a space north of the palace, which is still covered by the present building.
 
In 1817, under the auspices of King Frederick William III of Prussia, the community of the Supreme Parish Church, like most Prussian Calvinist and Lutheran congregations joined the common umbrella organization named Evangelical Church in Prussia (under this name since 1821), with each congregation maintaining its former denomination or adopting the new united denomination. The community of the Supreme Parish Church adopted the new denomination of the Prussian Union.

In celebration of the Union Karl Friedrich Schinkel remodeled the interior in the same year and in 1820–1822 the exterior of Boumann's church in the neoclassicist style. The Supreme Parish and Cathedral Church faced at its southern façade Berlin City Palace, the residence of the Hohenzollerns (severely damaged in World War II and demolished later by the East German government), and the Lustgarten park at its western front, which is still there.

Modern Berlin Cathedral (1893–present)
 
However, in the 19th century, a new building was under discussion, but the post-Napoleonic poverty made its realization impossible. After dismantling the movable interior (altar, paintings, sarcophagi), Boumann's building was demolished in 1893 and Julius and Otto Raschdorff, father and son, built the present Supreme Parish and Cathedral Church in exuberant forms of high Neo-Renaissance style.

With no separation of Protestant church and state of Prussia, Wilhelm II officiated as the summus episcopus (Supreme Governor of the Evangelical State Church of Prussia's older Provinces, as it was named since 1875) and the state paid the complete construction cost of 11.5 million Marks. On 27 February 1905, the present building was inaugurated.

In 1940, the blast waves of Allied bombing blew part of the windows away. On 24 May 1944, a bomb of combustible liquids entered the roof lantern of the dome. The fire could not be extinguished at that unreachable section of the dome. So the lantern burnt out and collapsed into the main floor. Between 1949 and 1953, a temporary roof was built to enclose the building. On 9 May 1967 the then still undivided Evangelical Church of the Union decided a committee for the reconstruction of the Supreme Parish and Cathedral Church, then located in East Berlin. The government of the Eastern German Democratic Republic did not oppose the work of the committee due to the concomitant inflow of Deutsche Marks.

In 1975, reconstruction started, simplifying the building's original design and demolishing the northern wing, the 'Denkmalskirche' – Memorial Church. Compared by some to the Medici Chapel, it had survived the war completely intact but was demolished for ideological reasons by the communist government due to it being a hall of honour for the Hohenzollern dynasty. This resulted in scaffolding for restoration appearing on the church while detonation charges were applied to its undamaged rear. The government also demanded the removal of as many crosses as possible. The demolition and redesign cost 800,000 marks, while the restoration (done on the cheap) cost just 50,000 marks. The Berlin Cathedral Building Society now seek to rebuild the Denkmalskirche.

In 1980, the baptistery and wedding church was reopened for services. The restoration of the nave was begun in 1984. On 6 June 1993, the nave was reinaugurated in an event attended by Federal Chancellor Helmut Kohl and televised nationwide in Germany. There has been discussion to restore the dome and surrounding cupolas to their original appearance, but this has not occurred due to a lack of funds.

Music

Main organ 

The pipe organ, built by Wilhelm Sauer, was fully restored during reconstruction. It has 113 stops, including three ranks of 32' pipes on the pedal division, played by a 4-manual console:

 II/I, III/I, IV/I, Super I, III/II, IV/II, Super II, IV/III, I/P, II/P, III/P, IV/P
 3 Freie Kombinationen, Mezzoforte, Forte, Tutti, Rohrwerke, Jalousieschweller III. Manual, Jalousieschweller IV. Manual, Jalousieschweller Vox humana, Handregister ab, Rückpositiv ab.

Ensembles 
Contributing to the cathedral's comprehensive concert programme is their own set of choirs (Berliner Domkantorei) and a brass ensemble (Berliner Dombläser). The Berlin Cathedral is also the main place of activity for the renowned boys' choir Staats- und Domchor Berlin, an institution of the Berlin University of the Arts. Since Advent 2015, The English Choir Berlin, a multinational SATB adult choir, sings Choral Evensong (Domvesper in anglikanisher Tradition) monthly on a Saturday evening and, from time to time sings at Sunday morning divine services.

See also

Religion in Berlin
List of tallest domes

Notes

References

External links 

Berlin Cathedral at Panoramas of German Cities
Berlin webcam including view of Berlin Cathedral and the Palace of the Republic by Deutsches Historisches Museum
Three-dimensional view of Berlin Cathedral (without plugin English, German, Spanish)

BerlinerDom
BerlinerDom
Buildings and structures in Mitte
Prussian cultural sites
Rebuilt buildings and structures in Berlin
Churches completed in 1905
20th-century Protestant churches
Berlin
Burial sites of the House of Orange-Nassau
Church buildings with domes
Baroque Revival architecture in Germany
Renaissance Revival architecture in Germany
1905 establishments in Germany